Ane Campos Andueza (born 21 May 1999) is a Spanish footballer who plays as a forward for Eibar.

Club career
Campos started her career at Zumaiako, where she played in the local Gipuzkoa provincial league. She then transferred to Oiartzun, appearing for their reserves in the regional third tier and their senior team in the second tier. In 2018 she signed for Primera División club Real Sociedad, but was assigned to their newly formed B-team in the Gipuzkoa league, helping them to win promotion with a near-perfect record. Campos then moved on again in 2019, to Eibar (newly promoted to the new Segunda División Pro), and again was part of a successful campaign as the armaginak went up to the top tier for the first time in a decade.

References

External links
Profile at La Liga

1999 births
Living people
Women's association football forwards
Spanish women's footballers
Sportspeople from Gipuzkoa
Footballers from the Basque Country (autonomous community)
Oiartzun KE players
Real Sociedad (women) players
SD Eibar Femenino players
Primera División (women) players
Segunda Federación (women) players
People from Urola Kosta
Primera Federación (women) players